Strathclyde University RFC is a rugby union club based in Glasgow, Scotland. The club operates a men's team and a women's team. Both currently play in the university leagues

History

The men's side plays an annual varsity match against Glasgow University RFC men's side.

Both the men's side and women's side teamed up with Glasgow Warriors to promote student rugby in 2019 in a one-year deal. This deal was later extended to 2022.

The university's Director of Rugby is Gary Strain, who had two spells at Glasgow Warriors as a player, and later helped out the Warriors as a scrum coach during the pandemic in the 2020–21 season. Strain commented on the deal:
The partnership and the rugby programme gives students the opportunity to train more like elite athletes, with much more professional sessions. Our new Strathclyde Sport facility has a fantastic gym with top quality strength and conditioning coaches who work hand in hand with me, so it lets the students improve as athletes. There's now a team of three coaches under me for the men's section and a head coach for the women, with 140 students in total and the eventual goal is to be the number one University in Scotland for rugby. There is a great culture of making friends and team sports is proven to have great benefits for health and mental wellbeing. Being a member of the team also hopefully makes university more of an enjoyable experience.

Sides

The club runs a men's side and a women's side. The men's side operates a 1st, 2nd XV and 3rd XV.

Training is held at Stepps Playing Fields on Saturdays and once in the midweek TBC.

Honours

Men

 3A Scottish University Conference
 Champions (2): 2004–05, 2012–13
 2A Scottish University Conference
 Champions (1): 2013-14
 Aberdeen University Sevens
 Champions: 2022

References

Rugby union in Glasgow
Scottish rugby union teams
University and college rugby union clubs in Scotland